The Naked Scientists is a one-hour audience-interactive science radio talk show broadcast live by the BBC in the East of England, nationally by BBC Radio 5 Live and internationally on ABC Radio National, Australia; it is also distributed globally as a podcast.

The programme was created and is edited by Cambridge University consultant virologist Dr Chris Smith. Former Naked Scientists line-up members include producers Phil Sansom, Adam Murphy, and Katie Haylor, with Peter Cowley adding ad-hoc technology perspectives.

History
Dr Chris Smith launched The Naked Scientists in 2001, rebranding the programme from a previous incarnation created in 2000 called ScienceWorld. Initially on commercial local radio, the show moved to the BBC's eastern region local radio network in 2003 where it was aired on Sundays on all 8 stations across the region. In August 2012, BBC East in response to national changes to local radio provision announced an impending change to the Sunday schedule which would have seen the show discontinued. In response to public reaction, the head of BBC East, Mick Rawsthorne, was interviewed on national radio about the decision to end the programme. Rawsthorne explained that the Naked Scientists did not fit the station's core purpose of providing "local radio". However, Rawsthorne did acknowledge the quality of the Naked Scientists programming and recognised that, with Cambridge University at the heart of Cambridgeshire, special consideration should be made for science in Cambridgeshire. Consequently, the BBC reconsidered their decision to terminate the programme and developed a proposal for it to continue as well as a way for enhanced scientific coverage and content to be integrated with other mainstream mid-week outputs of BBC Cambridgeshire, significantly increasing the reach of the programme and the representation of science at BBC Radio Cambridgeshire.

From January 2013, a new initiative involving the Naked Scientists also began on BBC Radio Norfolk. A dedicated hour of science Q and A was included in the station's Tea Time output (hosted by Matthew Gudgin) on alternate Wednesday evenings at 6pm. Listeners call, text, tweet or email with questions on any scientific subject and the team answer them.

From January 2013, the Naked Scientists programme also began to air across Australia on ABC Radio National, initially on a Sunday morning. From January 2014 the first airing of the programme was moved to a Friday evening 10pm slot, repeated on Sundays at 3pm. This show is also released as the Naked Scientists Podcast.

Launched in May 2014, 5 live Science is a new weekly one-hour programme from the Naked Scientists aired by BBC 5 live. Under the banner 5 live Science, it's a newly formatted version of the show produced by the Naked Scientists team and fronted by Dr Chris Smith; it airs nationally every Sunday morning. The programme is also released as a podcast under the same name.

Awards

Content
Each episode of the main Naked Scientists programme is one hour long and includes a digest of topical science news stories, audience questions answered live on the air and interviews with guest scientists. These individuals join the hosts in the studio to talk about their work and to take questions live from listeners. Previous featured guests include the discoverer of the DNA fingerprint,  Alec Jeffreys, the  Astronomer Royal  Sir Martin Rees, and the co-discoverer of DNA structure, James D. Watson.

The show also features on-location reports and interviews, and an ad-hoc interactive segment called Kitchen Science where listeners are encouraged to attempt a science experiment at home during the show. Kitchen Science experiments have included building a desktop trebuchet, a chocolate teapot and a liver powered bottle rocket.  The Kitchen Science segment also hosts experiments that listeners may not be able to do at home, such as generating X-rays from Sticky Tape with Dr Carlos Camara of UCLA and testing how much fat would stop a bullet with researchers at Cambridge University's Cavendish Laboratory.

Other media
The Naked Scientists appeared on TV Channel Five's panel game The What in the World? Quiz and have contributed to the 2007 Channel 4 programme "The Farm Revealed". In September 2008, with the Open University, the Naked Scientists launched a new UK national radio edition of their programme, The Naked Scientists - Up All Night (subsequently renamed "Breaking Science") which was broadcast on BBC Radio 5 Live for 12 months before finishing in 2009.

In November 2008, with the Royal Society of Chemistry, a series entitled The Naked Scientists In Africa began on Channel Africa, the international broadcasting service of the South African Broadcasting Corporation.   The Naked Scientists in Africa was produced by Naked Scientist team-member Meera Senthilingam, incorporating international science news and a focus on science stories originating in, or pertinent to, African countries. This project ran until 2010.

References

External links
 The Naked Scientists website
 Naked Scientists Podcast

BBC Radio 5 Live programmes
Audio podcasts
Science education
Science podcasts
Science and technology in the United Kingdom
Science radio programmes
British podcasts